Nawal Kishor Sah Sudi is a Nepalese politician and Minister for Social Development of Madhesh Province. He is also a member of the Provincial Assembly of Madhesh Province, from People's Socialist Party, Nepal. Sudi, a resident of Kankalini Municipality, Saptari was elected in the 2017 Nepalese provincial elections, from Saptari 1(B). He termed the Constitution Day of Nepal, September 19 as a black day for Madhesh.

Political career 
Sah started his political career from 1967. He was a central senior vice-chairperson of Rastriya Janata Party Nepal. In the 2017 Nepalese provincial elections, he stood as the Rastriya Janata Party Nepal candidate from Saptari 1(B) constituency and won. Later he became member of People's Socialist Party, Nepal since 2021 when the party got merged into it.

In May 2020, he provided assistance and inspection to set up Polymerase chain reaction (PCR) machines, one in Janakpur and the other one in Rajbiraj among the two machines bought by the state government.

In December 2020, he inaugurated thirteen rooms health post in the Hanumannagar Kankalini Municipality to ensure people that the government was working to provide health services in all local levels.

In June 2022, he inaugurated two-storey building for Shree Faud Singh Janta Secondary School in Sarlahi District along with Consul General of India in Nepal, Nitesh Kumar.

Anti-Constitution protest 
With the announcement of Constitution Day of Nepal on September 19 by the central government, Sah led anti-constitution protest in Saptari and Janakpur. Including other Madhesh Province ministers, he marked the day as a black day for Madhesh.

Personal life 
Nawal Kishor Sah was born on 27 September 1947 to parents, Bhola Sah and Kaushalya Devi.

Electoral history

2017 Nepalese provincial elections

References

External links

Living people
Madhesi people
Members of the Provincial Assembly of Madhesh Province
People from Saptari District
People's Socialist Party, Nepal politicians
1947 births
21st-century Nepalese politicians
Rastriya Janata Party Nepal politicians
Nepal MPs 2022–present